FM/TV Limża Transmitter - is a 320 Broadcasting Transmitting Centre with the mast 300 m high and for the aerial about the alt. of 20 m, built in 2001 by Mostostal Zabrze. Situated in the village Limża on the south-west of the Warmian-Masurian Voivodeship, a four kilometres from Kisielice. A company is an owner of the mast Emitel Sp.z.o.o.

Transmitted Programmes

Digital Television MPEG-4

FM Radio

See also
 List of masts

External links
 http://emi.emitel.pl/EMITEL/obiekty.aspx?obiekt=DODR_N2D
 http://radiopolska.pl/wykaz/pokaz_lokalizacja.php?pid=78
 http://www.przelaczenie.eu/mapy/warminskomazurskie

Iława County
Radio masts and towers in Poland
Towers completed in 2002
2002 establishments in Poland